Brian Naylor may refer to:
 Brian Naylor (broadcaster) (1931–2009), Australian broadcaster
 Brian Naylor (racing driver) (1923–1989), British racing driver